The Argentine National Time Trial Championships is a cycling race where the Argentine cyclists compete to decide who will become champion in the time trial discipline for the year to come.

Men

Elite

Under-23

Junior

Women

Elite

See also
Argentine National Road Race Championships
National Road Cycling Championships

References

National road cycling championships
Cycle races in Argentina